The 2003 Friuli-Venezia Giulia regional election took place on 8 June 2003.

Riccardo Illy, a centre-left independent, who had been Mayor of Trieste, defeated Alessandra Guerra, leading member of the Northern League.

Results

References

Elections in Friuli-Venezia Giulia
Friuli-Venezia Giulia regional election
Friuli-Venezia Giulia regional election